Kaharn Phetsivilay (born 9 September 1998), is a Laotian footballer currently playing as a midfielder.

Career statistics

International

References

1998 births
Living people
Laotian footballers
Laos international footballers
Association football midfielders
Competitors at the 2019 Southeast Asian Games
People from Luang Prabang
Competitors at the 2021 Southeast Asian Games
Southeast Asian Games competitors for Laos